The 2021 Armenia Women's International Friendly Tournament, also known as the Our Game International Friendly Tournament, was a friendly international women's football championship. It was held in Armenia from 7 to 12 April 2021, and was played by four teams: Lithuania, Armenia, Jordan, and Lebanon. The tournament was won by Lithuania, whereas hosts Armenia finished runners-up.

Teams

Participants 
Four teams entered the tournament.

Group stage

Champions

Goalscorers

References

External links
2021 Armenia Women's International Friendly Tournament at RSSSF

2021
Football competitions in Armenia
Armenia